The Shaqshaqiya or Shiqshiqiyya sermon is a sermon believed by Shi'a and some Sunni scholars to have been delivered by Ali.

Etymology
The title refers to an incident in which Ali interrupted his sermon to read a letter that had just arrived. After being asked to resume the sermon, Ali replied: "In no way, in no way. It was like the foam on the camel's mouth (shiqshiqa) as it opens its mouth to bellow and then falls silent."

Content
According to Gleave, Nahj al-Balagha's third sermon, Shaqshaqiya Sermon, in which Ali reveals his claim to Caliphate and his superiority over Abu bakr, Umar and Uthman, is the most controversial section of Nahj al-Balagha.

Ali addressed the moral characters and plots of other caliphs and his intent of becoming the Caliph. He also speaks about the people who abused the property of the early Islamic Community.

See also
List of notable Muslim reports

References

External links
http://www.al-islam.org/nahj/default.asp?url=3.htm

Islamic sermons
Shia Islam
Ali
7th-century speeches